Aleksandrs Sakovskis  (born 1965) is a Latvian Russian politician. He is a member of Harmony and a deputy of the 10th and 11th Saeima.

General references

External links
Saeima website

1965 births
Living people
Latvian people of Russian descent
National Harmony Party politicians
New Centre (Latvia) politicians
Social Democratic Party "Harmony" politicians
Deputies of the 10th Saeima
Deputies of the 11th Saeima